Montpelier is an unincorporated community in eastern Muscatine County, Iowa, United States.  Located along Iowa Highway 22, it lies on the Mississippi River above the city of Muscatine, the county seat of Muscatine County.  Its elevation is 568 feet (173 m). The community is part of the Muscatine Micropolitan Statistical Area.

Demographics

History
The first settlers were of Muscatine County were natives of Vermont, and they chose the name after the capital of that state, Montpelier.

Montpelier's post office was first established under the name of Iowa on April 19, 1836, changed to Montpelier on April 1, 1839, and discontinued on February 11, 1846.  Although it was reestablished on February 28, 1882, it was finally discontinued on February 18, 1986, when it was attached to the Blue Grass post office.  Although its post office is gone, Montpelier retains its own ZIP Code, 52759.

Education
Muscatine Community School District operates public schools serving the community. Muscatine High School is the district's high school.

References

Unincorporated communities in Muscatine County, Iowa
Unincorporated communities in Iowa
Muscatine, Iowa micropolitan area
1836 establishments in Michigan Territory